Piz Polaschin (3,013 m) is a mountain of the Albula Alps, overlooking Silvaplana in the canton of Graubünden, Switzerland. It lies east of Piz Lagrev, on the range south of the Julier Pass.

References

External links

 Piz Polaschin on Hikr

Mountains of the Alps
Mountains of Graubünden
Mountains of Switzerland
Alpine three-thousanders